The Walter Uetz Flugzeugbau was a Swiss aircraft manufacturer and design company. From the 1950s it built the CAB Minicab and Jodel D.11 which it sold in Switzerland and Austria. It later produced the U2V, a modified Jodel D.119 with a straight wing. 

First flown in 1963, Uetz designed and built the U3M Pelikan based on the U2V, but it was a four-seater with a Lycoming O-290 engine. The U3M was further developed as the U4M which had a Lycoming O-320 engine and flaps. The company ceased operating as an aircraft manufacturer in 1965; it had built 29 aircraft.

Aircraft
 CAB Minicab, built from plans for local sale.
 Jodel D.11, built from plans for local sale.
 Uetz U2V, a modified Jodel D.119 with a new wing.
 Uetz U2-MFGZ, a modified Jodel D.119 with a Jodel-designed wing, one built.
 Uetz U3M Pelikan, two built
 Uetz U4M Pelikan. two built plus an additional amateur-built aircraft.

References

Defunct aircraft manufacturers of Switzerland